Juventude Sport Clube, also commonly known as Juventude de Évora, (abbreviated Juv. Évora) is an amateur sports club based in Évora, Portugal, founded on 5 December, 1918, that competes in the Divisão de Elite of the Évora Football Association, part of the fifth tier of Portuguese association football (soccer). The club's home ground is the Sanches de Miranda Stadium in Évora and their motto is "."

Current squad

.

References

External links 
 
 

Football clubs in Portugal
Évora
Association football clubs established in 1918
1918 establishments in Portugal